Christian Chimino (born 9 February 1988) is an Argentine professional footballer who plays as a right-back for Arsenal de Sarandí.

Career
Chimino's career began with Ferro Carril Oeste in Primera B Nacional in 2010, with his first professional appearance coming against Unión Santa Fe on 5 March. Three seasons later, Chimino scored his first senior goal in April 2013 versus Gimnasia y Esgrima. In June 2014, Chimino departed Ferro Carril Oeste after eighty-eight appearances and two goals to join Arsenal de Sarandí of the Argentine Primera División. He went on to play four fixtures for Arsenal, scoring in his final match during a 1–6 win away to Atlético de Rafaela on 6 December 2014. 2015 saw Chimino sign for fellow Primera División team Temperley.

He subsequently started all thirty of Temperley's fixtures during the 2015 campaign. Chimino remained with Temperley for three seasons, scoring five times in sixty-two matches. On 6 July 2017, Chimino was signed by Huracán. His debut for the club arrived on 2 August in the 2017 Copa Sudamericana during a defeat to Libertad of Paraguay. Patronato, ahead of 2019–20, announced the signing of Chimino on 21 June 2019, eight days after Huracán had informed him that his contract wouldn't be renewed, controversially, via WhatsApp.

After a spell at Atlético de Rafaela in 2021, Chimino returned to his former club, Arsenal de Sarandí, in January 2022.

Career statistics
.

References

External links

1988 births
Living people
People from Luján, Buenos Aires
Argentine footballers
Association football defenders
Primera Nacional players
Argentine Primera División players
Ferro Carril Oeste footballers
Arsenal de Sarandí footballers
Club Atlético Temperley footballers
Club Atlético Huracán footballers
Club Atlético Patronato footballers
Atlético de Rafaela footballers
Sportspeople from Buenos Aires Province
Argentine people of Italian descent